Angus Graham (Aonghas Greumach) was a strongman born circa 1812 on the Isle of Lewis, Scotland, and died at Habost in the Port of Ness in the year 1896. Throughout life Angus achieved a name for himself as a man of outstanding physical strength. He was widely reported to be the strongest man on Lewis and possibly Britain. His incredible feats of strength have become folklore on the island, one being the rolling of a large boulder which is still to be seen on the Barvas moor in Lewis.  The large boulder, possibly weighing more than a ton, was moved by Angus when he was around 40 years old. In recent times, the boulder has been painted white, by someone wishing to ensure that the stone was not forgotten. This stone is marked by a commemorative plaque which was unveiled by Kenneth John Mackay, chairman of the Angus Graham Stone Committee, celebrating the strength of Angus Graham.

Many anecdotes still in circulation are based on his reputation as the strongest man in Lewis, sometimes getting confused with the feats of the other famous Hebridean strongman Angus MacAskill (who was confirmed as the strongest man ever to have lived, and who also lived in the Western Isles, upon the Isle of Berneray).

See also 
 Angus MacAskill
 Donald Dinnie
 Stone put
 Hammer toss
 Weight for Distance
 Weight for Height
 Sheaf toss
 Western Isles Strongest man

References

Scottish strength athletes
People from the Isle of Lewis
Scottish bodybuilders
1810s births
1896 deaths